Huang Qingqing (born 15 December 2003) is a Chinese sport shooter.

She participated at the 2018 ISSF World Shooting Championships, winning a medal.

References

External links

Living people
2003 births
Chinese female sport shooters
Running target shooters